The Seeds of Life is a German silent drama film directed by Georg Jacoby and starring Emil Jannings, Hanna Ralph, and Hans Junkermann. It was released in three parts. The third part in the series was released as Moral und Sinnlichkeit.

It was made by the PAGU company at the Tempelhof Studios in Berlin. The film's sets were designed by the art director Kurt Richter.

Cast
Emil Jannings as James Fraenkel, Börsenmarktler / John Smith, amerikanischer Ingenieur
Hanna Ralph as Marietta Fraenkel, Fabrikbesitzer
Hans Junkermann as Friedrich Wechmar
Martha Angerstein-Licho as Frau Wechmar
Marga Lindt as Frau von Borowicz
Adolf Klein as Dr. Thiel, Hausarzt bei Wechmars
Grete Diercks as Liese Bräer
Grete Sellin as Anna Beckmann
Toni Zimmerer as Karl Beckmann
Victor Janson as Graf Moros
Margarete Kupfer
Adolf E. Licho as Treugold, Literat

References

External links

1918 films
1919 films
Films of the Weimar Republic
Films directed by Georg Jacoby
German silent feature films
1918 drama films
German drama films
UFA GmbH films
German black-and-white films
Films shot at Tempelhof Studios
1919 drama films
Silent drama films
1910s German films